Ann G. DeVore (born March 23, 1936) is an American politician who served as the Auditor of Indiana from 1986 to 1994.

References

1936 births
Living people
Indiana State Auditors
Indiana Republicans